Carolina Andrea de Moras Alvarado (born 24 February 1981 in Osorno) is a Chilean model, actress and television presenter of French origin.

Cinema

Television

TV shows

Series and unitary

Specials

References

External links 
 

1981 births
People from Osorno, Chile
Chilean people of French descent
Chilean people of Italian descent
Chilean people of Spanish descent
Living people
Chilean female models
Chilean film actresses
Chilean television actresses
Chilean television presenters
Chilean women television presenters
Chilean television personalities